Heimo was a German producer of handpainted toy figurines and accessories. The company was headquartered in Germany.  The traditional market for Heimo products had been Mainland Europe, with half their sales in Austria followed by Germany, Italy and Spain.

History
The toy manufacturer Heimo GmbH was a German company in Germany. Since the end of the 1950s, it has been producing collective figures in cooperation with the US company Marx in Hamburg: one focus was on motifs according to Walt Disney, in addition to general popular figures from hard PVC and later hard rubber Such as Vikings, Romans, Pirates, Knights, Indians and Cowboys as well as US soldiers. From the 1960s, some figures were distributed unchanged under the name Heimo; Some were even produced only for the new company in Mölln founded by Marx's CEO Heitmann.

The design of products and the creation of tooling had been in-house.

This success story was copied very soon by the toy manufacturer Schleich, who then took over the market leadership from the 1990s onwards.

Although Heimo has been sold in many European countries, more information is rarely known to many collectors. This is explained by the fact that only the few with a company name (Sometimes the licensor is called Zuiyo instead) - there are no dated figurines. The logo shows a circle with a cross.

Notes

Toy companies of Germany
Figurine manufacturers